The Bigelow Tea Company (formerly R.C. Bigelow, Inc.) is an American manufacturer of dried teas based in Fairfield, Connecticut. It was founded by Ruth C. Bigelow in 1945, based on a recipe she marketed as "Constant Comment" tea. The company markets over 50 varieties of tea, including black, green, and herbal, all of which are blended in Fairfield. The company has other plants in Boise, Idaho, and Louisville, Kentucky.  Their Charleston Tea Garden in South Carolina is the only tea garden in America, but does not produce the "Bigelow Tea Company" teas. Still a 100% family-owned business, Bigelow employs 350 people and had annual sales in 2020 of approximately US$188.9 million.

Constant Comment
Constant Comment remains today one of Bigelow Inc.'s most popular products. It is a black tea flavored with orange rinds and sweet spices. The recipe was developed by interior designer Ruth Bigelow in 1945, from an old colonial tea recipe for making orange and spice flavored tea in stone containers.

In 1945, The New York Times food writer Jane Holt wrote about the newly introduced tea, calling it "unusual", "delicious", "concentrated", and "economical": 

A 1945 article by noted food writer Clementine Paddleford tells this story about the origin of the name:

Sales grew slowly but steadily, taking off in the 1970s when Bigelow began packing their teabags in folding cardboard boxes instead of tins. According to singer-songwriter Leonard Cohen, the famous lines, "and she feeds you tea and oranges / that come all the way from China", from his first hit song "Suzanne", refer to Constant Comment tea. The tea also gets a mention in the 1977 children's novella 'Mildred Murphy, how does your Garden Grow?' by Phyllis Green in which "[Mildred's] loneliness disappears when [she] befriends a secretive woman living in a condemned garage" who is fond of the tea.

In 2016, CEO Cindi Bigelow said of the recipe for Constant Comment: "the only two people who know the formula are my parents [Ruth Bigelow's son David, Jr. and his wife]" and that the recipe remains unchanged from the original since it was first developed.

See also
Earl Grey tea, an English tea blend flavored with oil from the bergamot orange, but no spices
List of tea companies

References

External links
Official Website
Bigelow Tea Blog
Article about Bigelow

Companies based in Fairfield County, Connecticut
Tea brands in the United States
Fairfield, Connecticut
Tea companies of the United States
Certified B Corporations in the Food & Beverage Industry
Family-owned companies of the United States